Michael Deal Alford (born June 19, 1943) is a former American football center who played two seasons in the National Football League with the St. Louis Cardinals and Detroit Lions. He was drafted by the St. Louis Cardinals in the fourteenth round of the 1965 NFL Draft. He was also drafted by the Kansas City Chiefs in the nineteenth round of the 1965 AFL Draft. Alford played college football at Auburn University and attended Choctawhatchee High School in Fort Walton Beach, Florida.

References

External links
Just Sports Stats

Living people
1943 births
Players of American football from Florida
American football centers
Auburn Tigers football players
St. Louis Cardinals (football) players
Detroit Lions players
People from DeFuniak Springs, Florida
Choctawhatchee High School alumni